El Derramador is a village in Valencia, Spain. It is part of the municipality of Requena and belongs to the comarca Requena-Utiel. It is one of the least populated areas which is more dedicated to irrigation. After the urban boom of Alicante, more and more villas appeared and old farmhouses are rehabilitated as a second homes.

Towns in Spain
Populated places in the Province of Valencia
Requena-Utiel